Ban Phanom is a village in Luang Prabang Province, Laos. The Lue peoples of this village are noted in particular for their cotton and silk weaving. Sale to tourists is now of prime importance to the local economy. Nearby is the Tomb of Mouhot, where Henri Mouhot lies.

References

External links
Video

Populated places in Luang Prabang Province